"Little Sister" is the first single released by the rock group Queens of the Stone Age from their fourth album Lullabies to Paralyze. It was first issued as a promotional single in December 2004, but was later released as a commercial single on March 7, 2005. The song was recorded live in the studio in one take.

Background
The song had been in the works for quite a while. An early version was recorded with Dave Grohl in 2002 for the album Songs for the Deaf, but was scrapped.  The unfinished recording was later distributed on a bootleg recording compilation. According to Josh Homme, the song was inspired by the "sort of sexual twist" of Doc Pomus's song of the same name, which is probably best known as recorded by Elvis Presley: "I like the amalgam of imagery that it puts forward, that throwing a little pebble at the girl's windows late at night, you know, trying to creep in the back door, you know. And I also love the Elvis song 'Little Sister' because I like the sort of sexual twist that's put on by 'little sister don't you do what your big sister done."

Live performances
When this song was performed on Saturday Night Live on May 14, 2005, actor/comedian Will Ferrell, who hosted the show, came onstage and played the cowbell as fictional Blue Öyster Cult member Gene Frenkle. This was a reprise of a role that Ferrell played in a famous 2000 sketch in which actor Christopher Walken demands, "More cowbell!" during the studio recording of that band's famous song, "(Don't Fear) The Reaper", much to the chagrin of the rest of the band.  The cowbell sound is in fact made by a jam block, as seen on the music video for the song; however, since his arrival in 2013, the band's subsequent drummer Jon Theodore has used a cowbell during live performances of the song. Pearl Jam frontman Eddie Vedder has performed the song twice with the band, in 2011 at his own PJ20 festival playing the jam block and in 2013 at Lollapalooza Chile playing the cowbell, also providing backing vocals on both occasions.

Other uses
The song has been featured in the show Entourage. It has also been featured in the video games Midnight Club 3: DUB Edition, Colin McRae: Dirt 2, and Project Gotham Racing 3. Additionally, it appears in the music video game series Rock Band as downloadable content individually or in a 3-song pack along with two other Queens of the Stone Age songs, "3's and 7's" and "Sick, Sick, Sick". It also appears as downloadable content for Rocksmith 2014 and can be bought individually or as a 5-song pack also including the songs, "No One Knows", "3's & 7's" , "Make It wit Chu", and "I Appear Missing".

Music video
The music video features the band playing in a dark room, with Josh Homme sporting a longer hair style, and girls dancing in the back behind a silhouette screen.

Track listings
CD:
 "Little Sister" (Album Version) - 2:57
 "The Blood Is Love" (Contradictator Remix) - 5:24
 "Little Sister" (CD-ROM video)

CD Maxi Single:
 "Little Sister" (Album Version) - 2:57
 "The Blood Is Love" (Contradictator Remix) - 5:24
 "Little Sister" (Contradictator Remix) - 3:29

7" (Picture Disc):
 "Little Sister" (Album Version) - 2:57
 "Little Sister" (Contradictator Remix) - 3:29

Personnel
 Josh Homme – lead vocals, lead guitar
 Joey Castillo – drums, percussion
 Alain Johannes – rhythm guitar
 Troy Van Leeuwen – bass, backing vocals

Charts

References

External links

2004 singles
Queens of the Stone Age songs
Songs written by Josh Homme
Songs written by Joey Castillo
Songs written by Troy Van Leeuwen
2004 songs
Interscope Records singles